Capo Miseno Lighthouse is an active lighthouse located at the end of the promontory, with the same name, that marks the north-western limit of the Gulf of Naples as well as the Gulf of Pozzuoli toward the Tyrrhenian Sea in the province of Naples.

Description
The first lighthouse was built in 1869, than rebuilt in 1953. The lighthouse is completely automated, powered by a solar unit and is operated by the Marina Militare with the identification code number 2402 E.F.

See also
 List of lighthouses in Italy
 Capo Miseno

References

External links

 Servizio Fari Marina Militare

Lighthouses in Italy